The Robert Award for Best Documentary Short is one of the merit awards presented by the Danish Film Academy at the annual Robert Awards ceremony. The award has been handed out since 1984.

Honorees

1980s 
 1985:  directed by 
 1986:  directed by Anne Wivel and Arne Bro
 1987:  directed by Malene Ravn and Bodil Trier
 1988:  directed by Anne Wivel
 1989: Lys directed by Jens Jørgen Thorsen

1990s 
 1990:  directed by Dola Bonfils
 1991:  directed by Ulla Boje Rasmussen
 1992: Not awarded
 1993:  directed by Jesper W. Nielsen and Brev til Jonas directed by Susanne Bier
 1994:  and  directed by Anja Dalhoff
 1995:  directed by Thomas Vinterberg
 1996: Carl Th.
 1997:  directed by Jesper Jargil
 1998:  directed by 
 1999:  directed by Bente Milton

2000s 
 2000:  directed by Jørgen Leth
 2001:  directed by Tómas Gislason
 2002:  directed by Dorte Høegh Brask
 2003:  directed by Jytte Rex
 2004:  directed by Jens Loftager
 2005:  directed by Laila Hodell and Bertel Torne
 2006:  directed by Nikolai Østergaard
 2008:  directed by Max Kestner
 2009:  directed by Anders Gustafsson and Patrik Book

2010s 
 2010:  directed by Birgitte Stærmose
 2011: Fini directed by Jacob Secher Schulsinger
 2012:  directed by Mira Jargil
 2013:  directed by 
 2014:  directed by Daniel Dencik
 2015:  directed by Kathrine Ravn Kruse
 2016: Home Sweet Home directed by Katrine Philp

See also 

 Robert Award for Best Documentary Feature
 Bodil Award for Best Documentary

References

External links 
  

1984 establishments in Denmark
Awards established in 1984
Awards for best film
Documentary Short